Another World is the fourth studio album by the folk band the Roches. It was released in 1985 on Warner Bros. Records and marked their final release for that label.

Track listing
 "Love Radiates Around" (Mark Johnson)
 "Another World" (Maggie, Terre & Suzzy Roche) 
 "Come Softly to Me" (Gary Troxel, Gretchen Christopher, Barbara Ellis)
 "Missing" (David Roche)
 "Face Down at Folk City" (Maggie, Terre & Suzzy Roche)
 "The Angry Angry Man" (Terre & Suzzy Roche)
 "Weeded Out" (Maggie, Terre & Suzzy Roche)
 "Older Girls" (Terre & Suzzy Roche)
 "Love to See You" (Suzzy Roche)
 "Gimme a Slice" (Maggie & Terre Roche)

Personnel
 Eluriel "Tinker" Barfield: bass guitar
 Gene Bianco: harp
 Carter Cathcart: drums, bass guitar, keyboards, electric guitars
 Francisco Centeno: bass guitar
 Sandy Humphrey: cookies
 Edd Kalehoff: synthesizers, keyboards, PP3
 Steve Love: electric guitar
 Roy Markowitz: drums
 Sammy Merendino: drums (Paiste cymbals)
 Maggie Roche: keyboards, singing
 Suzzy Roche: acoustic guitar, singing
 Terre Roche: electric and acoustic guitar, singing
 Andy Schwartz: electric guitar
 Lee Shapiro: synclavier
 Front cover photos: Lesley J. Avery
 Back cover photos: Clifford Fagin, Glen Zdon
 Art direction/design: Lesley J. Avery

"Love Radiates Around", "Missing", "The Angry Angry Man", "Love to See You" and "Gimme a Slice" mixed by Howard E. Lindeman at RPM Studio (thanks to Bob Mason). Assistant and additional engineering: Mike Krowiak

"Come Softly to Me", "Face Down at Folk City", "Weeded Out" and "Older Girls" mixed by Thom Panunzio at the Record Plant.

Notes
 (1, 4, 6, 10) Produced by Edd Kalehoff and Howard Lindeman for Edd Kalehoff Productions. Engineer: Howard Lindeman. Recorded at Producers Recording Studio.
 (2) Produced by Carter Cathcart and the Roches. Engineer: Carter Cathcart. Recorded and Mixed at Wild Twin Recording Studio.
 (3, 5, 7, 8, 9) Produced by Richard Gottehrer. Engineer: Thom Panunzio. Assistant and additional engineering: His Majesty Tom Swift. Recorded at the Record Plant.

References

1985 albums
The Roches albums
Warner Records albums
Albums produced by Richard Gottehrer